Shivala ghat is one of the largest ghats in Varanasi, India. It was built by King Balwant Singh in honour of Hindu god Shiva. A 19th century palace constructed by Nepalese king Sanjay Vikram Shah lies near the ghat.  Shivala ghat is inhabited by south Indian Hindus. The building along the ghat and palaces of Chet Singh were confiscated after the British suppressed the rebellion in which King of Varanasi also took part.

See also
Ghats in Varanasi

References

Ghats in Varanasi
Culture of Varanasi